Traditional Chinese astronomy has a system of dividing the celestial sphere into asterisms  or constellations, known as "officials" (Chinese  xīng guān).

The Chinese asterisms are generally smaller than the constellations of Hellenistic tradition. 
The Song dynasty (13th-century) Suzhou planisphere shows a total of 283 asterisms, comprising a total of 1,565  individual stars.
The asterisms are divided into four groups, the Twenty-Eight Mansions (Èrshíbā Xiù) along the ecliptic, and the Three Enclosures of the northern sky. 
The southern sky was added as a fifth group in the late Ming Dynasty based on European star charts, comprising an additional 23 asterisms.

The Three Enclosures (Sān Yuán) include the Purple Forbidden Enclosure, which is centered on the north celestial pole and includes those stars which could be seen year-round, while the other two straddle the celestial equator.

The Twenty-Eight Mansions form an ecliptic coordinate system used for those stars visible (from China) but not during the whole year, based on the movement of the moon over a lunar month.

History 

The Chinese system developed independently from the Greco-Roman system since at least the 5th century BC, although there may have been  earlier mutual influence, suggested by parallels to ancient Babylonian astronomy.

The system of twenty-eight lunar mansions is  very similar (although not identical) to the Indian Nakshatra system, and it is not currently known if there was mutual influence in the history of the Chinese and Indian systems.

The oldest extant Chinese star maps date to the Tang dynasty. Notable among them are the 8th-century Treatise on Astrology of the Kaiyuan Era and Dunhuang Star Chart.
It contains collections  of earlier Chinese astronomers (Shi Shen, Gan De and Wu Xian) as well as of Indian astronomy (which had reached China in the early centuries AD).
Gan De was a Warring States era (5th century BC) astronomer who according to the testimony of the Dunhuang Star Chart
enumerated 810 stars in 138 asterisms. The Dunhuang Star Chart itself has 1,585 stars grouped into 257 asterisms.

The number of asterisms, or of stars grouped into asterisms, never became fixed, but remained in the same order of magnitude (for the purpose of comparison, the star catalogue compiled by Ptolemy in the 2nd century had 1,022 stars in 48 constellations).
The 13th-century  Suzhou star chart has  1,565 stars in 283 asterisms, the 14th-century Korean Cheonsang Yeolcha Bunyajido has  1,467 stars in 264 asterisms, and  the celestial globe made by Flemish Jesuit Ferdinand Verbiest for the Kangxi Emperor in 1673 has 1,876 stars in 282 asterisms.

The southern sky was unknown to the ancient Chinese and is consequently not included in the traditional system. With European contact in the 16th century,  Xu Guangqi , an  astronomer of the late Ming Dynasty, introduced another 23 asterisms based on European star charts. The "Southern Sky" asterisms are now also treated as part of the traditional Chinese system.

Terminology
The character  originally had a more complicated form: , a phono-semantic character whose semantic portion, originally depicting three twinkling stars (three instances of the "sun" radical ).

The older term  is used only in describing constellations of the traditional system. The character   means "public official" (hence the English translation "officials" for the Chinese asterisms), but it is historically a variant glyph of  "temple, palace", in origin a pictogram of a large building.

"group of stars").

Three Enclosures
The Three Enclosures are the Purple Forbidden enclosure (Zǐ Wēi Yuán), the Supreme Palace enclosure (Tài Wēi Yuán) and the Heavenly Market enclosure (Tiān Shì Yuán).

The Purple Forbidden Enclosure occupies the northernmost area of the night sky. From the viewpoint of the ancient Chinese, the Purple Forbidden Enclosure lies in the middle of the sky and is circled by all the other stars.
It covers the Greek constellations  Ursa Minor, Draco, Camelopardalis, Cepheus, Cassiopeia, Auriga, Boötes, 
and parts of Ursa Major, Canes Venatici, Leo Minor and Hercules.

The Supreme Palace Enclosure covers the Greek constellations Virgo, Coma Berenices and Leo, 
and parts of Canes Venatici, Ursa Major and Leo Minor.

The Heavenly Market Enclosure covers the Greek constellations  Serpens, Ophiuchus, Aquila and Corona Borealis, 
and  parts of Hercules.

The Three Enclosures are each enclosed by two "wall" asterisms, designated  yuán "low wall, fence; enclosure" (not to be confused with the lunar mansion ""Wall"  ):

Purple Forbidden Left Wall 	 (Cassiopeia / Cepheus / Draco)
Purple Forbidden Right Wall 	 (Draco / Ursa Major / Camelopardalis)
Supreme Palace Left Wall 	 (Virgo / Coma Berenices)
Supreme Palace Right Wall 	 (Leo / Virgo)
Heavenly Market Left Wall 	 (Hercules / Serpens / Ophiuchus / Aquila)
Heavenly Market Right Wall 	 (Serpens / Ophiuchus / Hercules)

The Twenty-Eight Mansions

The Twenty-Eight Mansions are grouped into Four Symbols, each associated with a compass direction and containing seven mansions. The names and determinative stars are:

The Southern Asterisms

The sky around the south celestial pole was unknown to ancient Chinese. Therefore, it was not included in the Three Enclosures and Twenty-Eight Mansions system. However, by the end of the Ming Dynasty, Xu Guangqi introduced another 23 asterisms based on the knowledge of European star charts. These asterisms were since incorporated into the traditional Chinese star maps.

The asterisms are:

Chinese star names

Ancient Chinese astronomers designated names to the visible stars systematically, roughly more than one thousand years before Johann Bayer did it in a similar way. Basically, every star is assigned to an asterism. Then a number is given to the individual stars in this asterism. Therefore, a star is designated as "Asterism name" + "Number". The numbering of the stars in an asterism, however, is not based on the apparent magnitude of this star, but rather its position in the asterism. The Bayer system uses this Chinese method occasionally, most notably with the stars in the Big Dipper, which are all about the same magnitude; in turn, the stars of the Big Dipper,  in Chinese, are numbered in Chinese astronomy in the same order as with the Bayer designations, with Dubhe first in both cases.

For example, Altair is named  in Chinese.  is the name of the asterism (literally the Drum at the River).  is the number designation (two). Therefore, it literally means "the Second Star of the Drum at the River". (Bayer might have called Altair "Beta Tympani Flumine" if he had been cataloguing Chinese constellations.)

Some stars also have traditional names, often related to mythology or astrology.

These designations are still used in modern Chinese astronomy. All stars for which the traditional names are used in English are routinely translated by their traditional Chinese designations, rather than translations of their catalogue names.

By modern IAU constellation
The following is a list of the  88 IAU constellations with the Chinese translation of their names. 
Each linked article provides a list of the (traditional) Chinese names of the stars within each (modern) constellation.

Andromeda
Antlia
Apus
Aquarius
Aquila
Ara
Aries
Auriga
Boötes
Caelum
Camelopardalis
Cancer
Canes Venatici
Canis Major
Canis Minor
Capricornus
Carina
Cassiopeia
Centaurus
Cepheus
Cetus
Chamaeleon

Circinus
Columba
Coma Berenices
Corona Australis
Corona Borealis
Corvus
Crater
Crux
Cygnus
Delphinus
Dorado
Draco
Equuleus
Eridanus
Fornax
Gemini
Grus
Hercules
Horologium
Hydra
Hydrus
Indus

Lacerta
Leo
Leo Minor
Lepus
Libra
Lupus
Lynx
Lyra
Mensa
Microscopium
Monoceros
Musca
Norma
Octans
Ophiuchus
Orion
Pavo
Pegasus
Perseus
Phoenix
Pictor
Pisces

Piscis Austrinus
Puppis
Pyxis
Reticulum
Sagitta
Sagittarius
Scorpius
Sculptor
Scutum
Serpens
Sextans
Taurus
Telescopium
Triangulum
Triangulum Australe
Tucana
Ursa Major
Ursa Minor
Vela
Virgo
Volans
Vulpecula

See also
 Chinese calendar
 Chinese star maps
 Five elements (Chinese)
 Four Symbols (Chinese constellation)
 Lunar mansion
 Nakshatra
 Traditional Chinese star names

References

 Further reading 
 Book of Jin, volume 11–13
 Huainanzi'', volume 3

External links 
 Hong Kong Space Museum: Interactive Star Maps (download)
 Hong Kong Space Museum: English-Chinese Glossary of Chinese Star Regions, Asterisms and Star Name
 Hong Kong Space Museum: Chinese Starlore
  Astronomy
 SHOOTING STARS: China's Astronomical Legacy
 Ian Ridpath's Star Tales: The Chinese sky – a lost tradition

 
Chinese astrological signs